Desmiphora endibauna is a species of beetle in the family Cerambycidae. It was described by Galileo and Martins in 1998. It is known from Brazil.

References

Desmiphora
Beetles described in 1998